Meriem Beldi (ar : مريم بلدي), (born 20 December 1973 Algiers.) is an Algerian Andalusian classical musician.

Life 
She comes from a family of Arab-Andalusian music lovers. At age six with her mother, she attended an Arab-Andalusian music concert, of Farid Bensensa, her future mentor, who taught her music notions at the prestigious Andalusian music school El Mossilia El Djazairia in Algiers, and whose masters were Sid Ahmed Serri and Sid Ali Benmerabet.

After a short career as a flight attendant at Air Algeria, she recorded three albums in total, the first entitled "There's Rache el faten" recorded in 2001, it consists of two parts "Inkilabet Zidane" with a style of Constantine, the second entitled ''Nouba Hassine'' directed by Nacer Dhinne Benmerabet, recorded in 2002 in the prestigious studio Bouabdelah Zerouki.

After a nine years absence to raise a family, she returned with a new and third album "Zidane Nouba", recorded in Paris and released first in Algiers, 27 December 2014.

She participated as a singer in several concerts in Algeria and abroad, including two in 1998 at the Lisbon World Exhibition in 2003, and in Portugal during the Year of Algeria in France.

Discography 
 2001 : Y'a Rache el faten
 2002 : Nouba Hassine
 2014 : Nouba Zidane

Notes and references 

1973 births
Living people
21st-century Algerian women singers